Ryan Allsop (born 17 June 1992) is an English professional footballer who plays as a goalkeeper for Cardiff City.

He started his career as a youth player at West Bromwich Albion, before moving to Millwall in 2011. After short spells with Icelandic club Höttur, with whom he made his debut in senior football, and Leyton Orient, with whom he first appeared in the Football League, he joined AFC Bournemouth in 2013. He spent time on loan at Coventry City, Wycombe Wanderers, Portsmouth, Blackpool and Lincoln City, and made 23 league appearances for Bournemouth, including two in the Premier League, before returning to Wycombe Wanderers in 2018 for three seasons.

Career
Allsop began his career in the youth ranks at West Bromwich Albion, progressing to the reserve team before being called up to sit on the bench for a first team match against Wigan Athletic. During his time at West Bromwich, he was called up to the England U17 team, and he also spent time on loan with Stockport County, although he did not play.

He was signed by Millwall manager Kenny Jackett in May 2011, but he did not make a first-team appearance for the Lions, and was released in April 2012 after becoming fourth-choice goalkeeper at the club. He subsequently signed a short-term deal with Icelandic club Höttur, making 10 appearances in league and cup before moving back to England and signing for Leyton Orient on a six-month contract in July 2012.

With Orient's first- and second-choice goalkeepers Jamie Jones and Lee Butcher injured, Allsop made his professional debut in the first game of the 2012–13 season, a Football League Cup tie at Charlton Athletic on 14 August 2012. The match ended in a 1–1 draw and a penalty shoot-out, in which Allsop saved Johnnie Jackson's penalty as Orient went through to the second round 4–3. He made his league debut on 1 September in the 1–0 defeat at Crawley Town.

Allsop signed for AFC Bournemouth on a free transfer on 18 January 2013.

On 4 July 2014, Allsop joined Coventry on loan until January 2015.

On 29 November 2015, Allsop made his Premier League debut as a Bournemouth player, coming on as a substitute at half time in a 3–3 draw against Everton.

On 1 February 2016, Allsop joined League Two side, Wycombe Wanderers on loan until the end of the 2015–16 season.

On 12 May 2016, Allsop joined Portsmouth on a seven-day emergency loan for their play-off semi-final first leg against Plymouth Argyle.

On 18 July 2017, Allsop joined Blackpool F.C. on a season-long loan, before the Loan was terminated on 8 January 2018.

On 31 January 2018, following the injury to first team goalkeeper Josh Vickers, Allsop Joined Lincoln City F.C. until the end of the season. 6 days later his save proved crucial as Lincoln won 4–2 on penalties in the semi-finals of the EFL Trophy against Chelsea Under-21s, and he then played in the final at Wembley as Lincoln won the competition.

He was released by Bournemouth at the end of the 2017–18 season. On 21 June 2018, Allsop re-joined Wycombe Wanderers on a three-year contract.

During the 2020/21 season Allsop lost his place to David Stockdale. It was announced on 12 May 2021 that he would not be offered a new deal at Wycombe and he would leave at the end of the season.

On 6 August 2021, Allsop signed a one-year contract with Derby County following a trial period with the club.

On 16 June 2022, Allsop agreed a two-year deal to join Cardiff City upon the expiration of his contract with Derby County on 1 July.

Career statistics

Honours
Lincoln City
EFL Trophy: 2017–18

Wycombe Wanderers
EFL League One play-offs: 2020

References

External links

England stats at theFA

1992 births
Living people
English footballers
Footballers from Birmingham, West Midlands
Association football goalkeepers
England youth international footballers
Premier League players
English Football League players
1. deild karla players
West Bromwich Albion F.C. players
Millwall F.C. players
Stockport County F.C. players
Leyton Orient F.C. players
AFC Bournemouth players
Coventry City F.C. players
Wycombe Wanderers F.C. players
Portsmouth F.C. players
Blackpool F.C. players
Lincoln City F.C. players
Íþróttafélagið Höttur players
Derby County F.C. players
Cardiff City F.C. players
English expatriate footballers
English expatriate sportspeople in Iceland
Expatriate footballers in Iceland